Texas's 15th congressional district of the United States House of Representatives includes a thin section of the far south of the state of Texas.  The district's current Representative is Republican Monica de la Cruz. Elected in 2022, de la Cruz is the first Republican to represent the district.

Currently, the 15th Congressional District composes of a narrow strip of land running from Hidalgo County  in the Rio Grande Valley  northwards to  Seguin  in Guadalupe County, to the east of San Antonio. The current boundaries of the district include the entire Brooks, Duval, Jim Hogg, Karnes, and Live Oak counties, and parts of Guadalupe, Hidalgo, and Wilson counties. The largest city fully in the district is McAllen, on the Mexico border.

The district has generally given its congressmen very long tenures in Washington; only eight people, seven Democrats and one Republican, have ever represented it. The district's best-known Representative was John Nance Garner, who represented the district from its creation in 1903 until 1933, and was Speaker of the House from 1931 to 1933. He ran with Franklin D. Roosevelt in the 1932 and 1936 presidential campaigns, and was elected Vice President of the United States, serving from 1933 to 1941. The district was one of the first Latino-majority districts in the country, and has been represented by Latino congressmen since 1965.

Notably, this district narrowly voted more Republican in the House elections than the nation as a whole in 2020. Vincente Gonzalez won by 2.9 points while Democrats won the national vote by a combined 3.1 percentage points. It also voted more Republican than the national average while voting Democratic in the 2020 United States presidential election, and the difference between the national vote and the result was wider in the presidential election than the House. Due to redistricting, incumbent Gonzalez in the 2022 election ran in the 34th congressional district. The Republican nominee, former insurance agent Monica de la Cruz defeated the Democratic nominee, businesswoman Michelle Vallejo.

Election results from presidential races 
Results Under Current Lines (Since 2023)

List of members representing the district

Election results

1920

1922

1924

1926

1928

1930

1932

1933 (Special)

1934

1936

1938

1940

1942

1944

1946

1948 (Special)

1948

1950

1952

1954

1956

1958

1960

1962

1964

1966

1968

1970

1972

1974

1976

1978

1980

1982

1984

1986

1988

1990

1992

1994

1996

1998

2000

2002

2004

2006 (Special)

2008

2010

2012

2014

2016

2018

2020

2022

Historical district boundaries

See also

List of United States congressional districts

References
Specific

General

 Congressional Biographical Directory of the United States 1774–present

15